Bredeshave is a former manor house located at Tappernøse, Næstved Municipality  Denmark. The estate was established as a farm under Bækkeskov in 1786 and granted status of a manor in 1802. Its most notable former owner is Charles August Selby. It is now owned by a foundation and operated as a social institution. All the land has been sold.

History

Origins
 
Bredeshave was originally a farm under Bækkeskov. A fruit garden was constructed on the site by Otto Christopher von Munthe af Morgenstierne in 1782. The main building wasz constructed for him in 1782. It was named after his father, Bredo von Munthe af Mogenstierne, who had created a garden at the site. In 1796, Bekkeskov and Bredeshave was sold to Charles August Selbye. In 1796, he was ennobled with rank of baron.

18th century

In 1802, Bredeshave was sold to Georg Johannes Røbye. The estate was in the same time granted status of a manor. He sold the estate in 1805 and it then changed hands a number of times over the next one and a half decades.

In 1821, Bredeshave was acquired by Heinrich Christian Valentiner. He was originally from Holstein. In 1922, he also purchased Gjeddesdal at Yåstrup hwre he settled with his family. He established his own slaughterhouse at Gjeddesdal, salting the meat and exporting it to France and the Netherlands. From 1828 he also kept dairy cattle and opened a dairy on the estate shortly before his death. Valentiner's son, C. Ulrik Valentiner, sold Bredeshave in 1836  to captain P.E. Bjørn.

20th century
In 1902, Bredeshave was cquired by S.F. Gede. In 1906, he sold the estate to Christian  Suenson (1761-1856). His father Jean André Suenson had thus leased Anneberggaard in Odsherred. His wifeMargrete (née Lacoppidan) had been born at Lehnskov. Their first son, who was born at Bredesgave in October 1917, was given the name Jean Nicolai Bredo Lacoppidan Suenson, probably as a reference to the estate's first owner. In 1819, Suenson sold Bredeshave to  A.G.C. Jessen. The estate changed hands amny time over the next decades.

Today
Bredeshave is now owned by Marjattahjemmenes Støttefond and operated as an institution for people with a mental handicap.og fungerer som en selvstændig institution for udviklingshæmmede.

List of owners
 ( -1796) Otto Christopher von Munthe af Morgenstierne
 (1796-1802) Charles August Selby 
 (1802-1805) Georg Johannes Røbye 
 (1805-1810) Jens Ludvig Christensen 
 (1810) Frederik Raben-Huitfeldt 
 (1810-1821) Christen Sørensen 
 (1821- ) Henrik Chr. Valentiner 
 ( -1836) Chr. Ulrik Valentiner 
 (1836-1851) P.E. Bjørn 
 (1851-1856) Joachim Nicolai Nohr 
 (1856-1860) J.G.H. Gutzon Münster 
 (1860-1876) P.G. Münster 
 (1876- ) C.E.H. Münster 
 (1902-1916) S.F. Gede 
 (1916-1919) Chr. Suenson 
 (1919-1921) A.G.C. Jessen 
 (1921-1924) J. Berntsen 
 (1924-1928) E.V. Hoffmann 
 (1928-1937) V. Kruse 
 (1937- ) P. Fugmann 
 (2005- ) Marjattahjemmenes Støttefond

References

External links
 [

Manor houses in Næstved Municipality
Houses completed in 1782